Robert Allen Coldsnow (September 26, 1924 – January 23, 2014) was an American politician. He served as a member of the Kansas House of Representatives from 1965 to 1970. He was born in Kansas City, Missouri, and died in Topeka, Kansas. Coldsnow received his bachelor's degree from University of Kansas and his law degree from University of Kansas School of Law. He practiced law in Topeka, Kansas and later was the attorney for the Kansas State Legislature.

References

Members of the Kansas House of Representatives
1924 births
2014 deaths
Politicians from Kansas City, Missouri
Politicians from Topeka, Kansas
University of Kansas alumni
University of Kansas School of Law alumni
Kansas lawyers
Lawyers from Kansas City, Missouri
20th-century American lawyers
Republican Party members of the Kansas House of Representatives